The anchor bend is a knot used for attaching a rope to a ring or similar termination. The name is a misnomer, as it is technically not a bend, but a hitch.

Origins

Its name originates from the time when "bend" was understood to simply mean "tie to"; today, a bend strictly refers to a knot that joins two lines.

Techniques
While the knot can become jammed in some modern materials, it is usually easily untied after moderate loads; it can be made more resistant to jamming by taking an extra turn around the object—this will make for a one-diameter longer span of the end to reach around the standing part to be tucked (although in a case of tying to a small shackle or link of a chain, this might not be possible). It is the accepted knot for attaching anchors (or more usually anchor chains) to warps. The knot is very similar to a round turn and two half hitches except that the first half hitch is passed under the turn.  In many everyday uses, the finishing half-hitch need not be made; alternatively, one might seek surer security by tying off the end with a strangle knot to the standing part.

See also

 Round turn and two half-hitches
 List of knots
List of hitch knots

External links